The free radical theory of aging (FRTA) states that organisms age because cells accumulate free radical damage over time. A free radical is any atom or molecule that has a single unpaired electron in an outer shell. While a few free radicals such as melanin are not chemically reactive, most biologically relevant free radicals are highly reactive. For most biological structures, free radical damage is closely associated with oxidative damage. Antioxidants are reducing agents, and limit oxidative damage to biological structures by passivating them from free radicals.

Strictly speaking, the free radical theory is only concerned with free radicals such as superoxide ( O2− ), but it has since been expanded to encompass oxidative damage from other reactive oxygen species (ROS) such as hydrogen peroxide (H2O2), or peroxynitrite (OONO−).

Denham Harman first proposed the free radical theory of aging in the 1950s, and in the 1970s extended the idea to implicate mitochondrial production of ROS.

In some model organisms, such as yeast and Drosophila, there is evidence that reducing oxidative damage can extend lifespan. However, in mice, only 1 of the 18 genetic alterations (SOD-1 deletion) that block antioxidant defences,  shortened lifespan. Similarly, in roundworms (Caenorhabditis elegans), blocking the production of the naturally occurring antioxidant superoxide dismutase has recently been shown to increase lifespan.  Whether reducing oxidative damage below normal levels is sufficient to extend lifespan remains an open and controversial question.

Background 
The free radical theory of aging was conceived by Denham Harman in the 1950s, when prevailing scientific opinion held that free radicals were too unstable to exist in biological systems.  This was also before anyone invoked free radicals as a cause of degenerative diseases. Two sources inspired Harman: 1) the rate of living theory, which holds that lifespan is an inverse function of metabolic rate which in turn is proportional to oxygen consumption, and 2) Rebeca Gerschman's observation that hyperbaric oxygen toxicity and radiation toxicity could be explained by the same underlying phenomenon: oxygen free radicals. Noting that radiation causes "mutation, cancer and aging", Harman argued that oxygen free radicals produced during normal respiration would cause cumulative damage which would eventually lead to organismal loss of functionality, and ultimately death.

In later years, the free radical theory was expanded to include not only aging per se, but also age-related diseases. Free radical damage within cells has been linked to a range of disorders including cancer, arthritis, atherosclerosis, Alzheimer's disease, and diabetes. There has been some evidence to suggest that free radicals and some reactive nitrogen species trigger and increase cell death mechanisms within the body such as apoptosis and in extreme cases necrosis.

In 1972, Harman modified his original theory. In its current form, this theory proposes that reactive oxygen species (ROS) that are produced in the mitochondria, causes damage to certain macromolecules including lipids, proteins and most importantly mitochondrial DNA. This damage then causes mutations which lead to an increase of ROS production and greatly enhance the accumulation of free radicals within cells. This mitochondrial theory has been more widely accepted that it could play a major role in contributing to the aging process.

Since Harman first proposed the free radical theory of aging, there have been continual modifications and extensions to his original theory.

Processes

Free radicals are atoms or molecules containing unpaired electrons. Electrons normally exist in pairs in specific orbitals in atoms or molecules. Free radicals, which contain only a single electron in any orbital, are usually unstable toward losing or picking up an extra electron, so that all electrons in the atom or molecule will be paired.

The unpaired electron does not imply charge; free radicals can be positively charged, negatively charged, or neutral.

Damage occurs when the free radical encounters another molecule and seeks to find another electron to pair its unpaired electron. The free radical often pulls an electron off a neighboring molecule, causing the affected molecule to become a free radical itself. The new free radical can then pull an electron off the next molecule, and a chemical chain reaction of radical production occurs. The free radicals produced in such reactions often terminate by removing an electron from a molecule which becomes changed or cannot function without it, especially in biology. Such an event causes damage to the molecule, and thus to the cell that contains it (since the molecule often becomes dysfunctional).

The chain reaction caused by free radicals can lead to cross-linking of atomic structures. In cases where the free radical-induced chain reaction involves base pair molecules in a strand of DNA, the DNA can become cross-linked.

DNA cross-linking can in turn lead to various effects of aging, especially cancer.  Other cross-linking can occur between fat and protein molecules, which leads to wrinkles.  Free radicals can oxidize LDL, and this is a key event in the formation of plaque in arteries, leading to heart disease and stroke. These are examples of how the free-radical theory of aging has been used to neatly "explain" the origin of many chronic diseases.

Free radicals that are thought to be involved in the process of aging include superoxide and nitric oxide.  Specifically, an increase in superoxide affects aging whereas a decrease in nitric oxide formation, or its bioavailability, does the same.

Antioxidants are helpful in reducing and preventing damage from free radical reactions because of their ability to donate electrons which neutralize the radical without forming another. Ascorbic acid, for example, can lose an electron to a free radical and remain stable itself by passing its unstable electron around the antioxidant molecule.

This has led to the hypothesis that large amounts of antioxidants, with their ability to decrease the numbers of free radicals, might lessen the radical damage causing chronic diseases, and even radical damage responsible for aging.

Evidence 
Numerous studies have demonstrated a role for free radicals in the aging process and thus tentatively support the free radical theory of aging. Studies have shown a significant increase in superoxide radical (SOR) formation and lipid peroxidation in aging rats. Chung et al. suggest ROS production increases with age and indicated the conversion of XDH to XOD may be an important contributing factor. This was supported by a study that showed superoxide production by xanthine oxidase and NO synthase in mesenteric arteries was higher in older rats than young ones.
 
Hamilton et al. examined the similarities in impaired endothelial function in hypertension and aging in humans and found a significant overproduction of superoxide in both. This finding is supported by a 2007 study which found that endothelial oxidative stress develops with aging in healthy men and is related to reductions in endothelium-dependent dilation. Furthermore, a study using cultured smooth muscle cells displayed increased ROS in cells derived from older mice. These findings were supported by a second study using Leydig cells isolated from the testes of young and old rats.

The Choksi et al. experiment with Ames dwarf (DW) mice suggests the lower levels of endogenous ROS production in DW mice may be a factor in their resistance to oxidative stress and long life. Lener et al. suggest Nox4 activity increases oxidative damage in human umbilical vein endothelial cells via superoxide overproduction. Furthermore, Rodriguez-Manas et al. found endothelial dysfunction in human vessels is due to the collective effect of vascular inflammation and oxidative stress.

Sasaki et al. reported superoxide-dependent chemiluminescence was inversely proportionate to maximum lifespan in mice, Wistar rats, and pigeons. They suggest ROS signalling may be a determinant in the aging process.  In humans, Mendoza-Nunez et al. propose an age of 60 years or older may be linked with increased oxidative stress.  Miyazawa found mitochondrial superoxide anion production can lead to organ atrophy and dysfunction via mitochondrial- mediated apoptosis. In addition, they suggest mitochondrial superoxide anion plays an essential part in aging. Lund et al. demonstrated the role of endogenous extracellular superoxide dismutase in protecting against endothelial dysfunction during the aging process using mice.

Modifications of the theory 
One of the main criticisms of the free radical theory of aging is directed at the suggestion that free radicals are responsible for the damage of biomolecules, thus being a major reason for cellular senescence and organismal aging. Several modifications have been proposed to integrate current research into the overall theory.

Mitochondrial theory of aging 

The mitochondrial theory of aging was first proposed in 1978, and two years later, the mitochondrial free-radical theory of aging was introduced. The theory implicates the mitochondria as the chief target of radical damage, since there is a known chemical mechanism by which mitochondria can produce ROS, mitochondrial components such as mtDNA are not as well protected as nuclear DNA, and by studies comparing damage to nuclear and mtDNA that demonstrate higher levels of radical damage on the mitochondrial molecules. Electrons may escape from metabolic processes in the mitochondria like the Electron transport chain, and these electrons may in turn react with water to form ROS such as the superoxide radical, or via an indirect route the hydroxyl radical. These radicals then damage the mitochondria's DNA and proteins, and these damage components in turn are more liable to produce ROS byproducts. Thus a positive feedback loop of oxidative stress is established that, over time, can lead to the deterioration of cells and later organs and the entire body.

This theory has been widely debated and it is still unclear how ROS induced mtDNA mutations develop. Conte et al. suggest iron-substituted zinc fingers may generate free radicals due to the zinc finger proximity to DNA and thus lead to DNA damage.

Afanas'ev suggests the superoxide dismutation activity of CuZnSOD demonstrates an important link between life span and free radicals. The link between CuZnSOD and life span was demonstrated by Perez et al. who indicated mice life span was affected by the deletion of the Sod1 gene which encodes CuZnSOD.

Contrary to the usually observed association between mitochondrial ROS (mtROS) and a decline in longevity, Yee et al. recently observed increased longevity mediated by mtROS signaling in an apoptosis pathway. This serves to support the possibility that observed correlations between ROS damage and aging are not necessarily indicative of the causal involvement of ROS in the aging process but are more likely due to their modulating signal transduction pathways that are part of cellular responses to the aging process.

Epigenetic oxidative redox shift (EORS) theory of aging
Brewer proposed a theory which integrates the free radical theory of aging with the insulin signalling effects in aging. Brewer's theory suggests "sedentary behaviour associated with age triggers an oxidized redox shift and impaired mitochondrial function".  This mitochondrial impairment leads to more sedentary behaviour and accelerated aging.

Metabolic stability theory of aging
The metabolic stability theory of aging suggests it is the cells ability to maintain stable concentration of ROS which is the primary determinant of lifespan.  This theory criticizes the free radical theory because it ignores that ROS are specific signalling molecules which are necessary for maintaining normal cell functions.

Mitohormesis 
Oxidative stress may promote life expectancy of Caenorhabditis elegans by inducing a secondary response to initially increased levels of ROS. In mammals, the question of the net effect of reactive oxygen species on aging is even less clear. Recent epidemiological findings support the process of mitohormesis in humans, and even suggest that the intake of exogenous antioxidants may increase disease prevalence in humans (according to the theory, because they prevent the stimulation of the organism's natural response to the oxidant compounds which not only neutralizes them but provides other benefits as well).

Effects of calorie restriction 

Studies have demonstrated that calorie restriction displays positive effects on the lifespan of organisms even though it is accompanied by increases in oxidative stress.  Many studies suggest this may be due to anti-oxidative action, oxidative stress suppression, or oxidative stress resistance which occurs in calorie restriction.  Fontana et al. suggest calorie restriction influenced numerous signal pathways through the reduction of insulin-like growth factor I (IGF-1). Additionally they suggest antioxidant SOD and catalase are involved in the inhibition of this nutrient signalling pathway.

The increase in life expectancy observed during some calorie restriction studies which can occur with lack of decreases or even increases in O2 consumption is often inferred as opposing the mitochondrial free radical theory of aging. According to a study by G. Barja, significant decreases in mitochondrial oxygen radical production (per unit of O2 consumed) occur during dietary restriction, aerobic exercise, chronic exercise, and hyperthyroidism. Additionally, mitochondrial oxygen radical generation is lower in long-lived birds than in short-lived mammals of comparable body size and metabolic rate. Thus, mitochondrial ROS production must be regulated independently of O2 consumption in a variety of species, tissues and physiologic states.

Challenges to the theory

Naked mole-rat

The naked mole-rat is a long-lived (32 years) rodent.  As reviewed by Lewis et al., (2013), levels of ROS production in the naked mole rat are similar to that of another rodent, the relatively short-lived mouse (4 years).  They concluded that it is not oxidative stress that modulates health-span and longevity in these rodents, but rather other cytoprotective mechanisms that allow animals to deal with high levels of oxidative damage and stress.  In the naked mole-rat, a likely important cytoprotective mechanism that could provide longevity assurance is elevated expression of DNA repair genes involved in several key DNA repair pathways. (See DNA damage theory of aging.)  Compared with the mouse, the naked mole rat had significantly higher expression levels of genes essential for the DNA repair pathways of DNA mismatch repair, non-homologous end joining and base excision repair.

Birds

Among birds, parrots live about five times longer than quail. ROS production in heart, skeletal muscle, liver and intact erythrocytes was found to be similar in parrots and quail and showed no correspondence with longevity difference. These findings were concluded to cast doubt on the robustness of the oxidative stress theory of aging.

See also
 American Aging Association
 Life extension
 List of life extension-related topics
 Senescence
 Calorie restriction
 Denham Harman
 Mitochondrial theory of ageing

References

External links

Calorie restriction
Calorie Restriction Society.

Biology of Aging
Damage-Based Theories of Aging Includes a discussion of the free radical theory of aging.

Senescence

Theories of ageing
Theories of biological ageing
Proximate theories of biological ageing